Raolefu station is a station on Yanfang Line of the Beijing Subway. It was opened on 30 December 2017.

Station Layout 
The station has 1 elevated island platform and 1 elevated side platform. Only the inner platform of the island platform is in service, with the outer platform currently out of use.

Exits 
There are 2 exits, lettered A and B. Exit B is accessible.

Gallery

References 

Beijing Subway stations in Fangshan District